Lorraine Fouchet is a French writer. Before devoting herself to writing, she was an emergency doctor. She is the author of nineteen novels, including the bestseller Entre ciel et Lou, which won the Prix Ouest and the Prix Breizh. In 2014, she published J’ai rendez-vous avec toi, an open letter to her father Christian Fouchet. She lives between Yvelines and the island of Groix.

References

French writers
Year of birth missing (living people)
Living people
20th-century births